Baku Baku, released in Japan as  is a falling block puzzle arcade game released by Sega in 1995. The game is dedicated as Sega's first ever Network Compatible PC Game. A Sega NetLink compatible version of the game was also announced, but never released.

The Japanese onomatopoeia "Baku Baku" roughly translates to "Chomp Chomp".

Gameplay

The player must line up falling blocks of animals and foodstuffs. When an animal is aligned adjacent to a tile of its favored food, the animal eats the food. Larger groups of connected food of the same type scores higher when eaten.

When animals eat foodstuffs, they also make random blocks fall on the opponent's area, right after the currently falling blocks. The object of the game is to make one's opponent unable to place more blocks.

Reception

In Japan, Game Machine listed Baku Baku Animal on their June 1, 1995 issue as being the eleventh most-successful arcade game of the month.

The Saturn version was met with critical acclaim upon release, with Maximum calling it "the best 'next generation' puzzle game we've seen to date", Sega Saturn Magazine "some of the most addictive puzzle play since Tetris", GameSpot "a must own" for "Saturn owners who have even a remote interest in puzzle games", and GamePro "undeniably the best puzzle game in the world so far." Critics lauded the addictive gameplay, especially in two-player competitive mode, but the ludicrously cute graphics and sounds were met with general approval as well.

Reviewing the Game Gear version, the four reviewers of Electronic Gaming Monthly commented that the gameplay concept of Baku Baku Animal is simple and accessible, yet has enough strategic possibilities to engage even veteran players. Andrew Baran summarized it as "non-threatening fun anyone can enjoy".

Baku Baku won Computer Gaming Worlds 1996 "Classic/Puzzle Game of the Year" award. The editors wrote, "The beauty of this game [...] lies in its ability to suck you in and keep you coming back for more and more. If you haven't already tried it, beware: Baku Baku will eat up your time." It was a finalist for the Computer Game Developers Conference's 1996 "Best Trivia or Puzzle Game" Spotlight Award, but lost the prize to You Don't Know Jack XL. Electronic Gaming Monthly named the Game Gear version a runner up for "Hand-Held Game of the Year" and the Saturn version a runner up for "Puzzle Game of the Year" (beaten in both cases by Tetris Attack).

Baku Baku Animal was named the 72nd best computer game ever by PC Gamer UK in 1997.

Other media
A white label 12 inch EP consisting entirely of dance tracks using sound effects from Baku Baku Animal, recorded by The Dream Team and Timebase for the Suburban Base label, was circulated to disc jockeys in 1996.

Notes

References

External links

 Baku Baku demo for Windows 95 - Sega of America

1995 video games
Arcade video games
Minato Giken games
Falling block puzzle games
Sega video games
Game Gear games
Master System games
Sega Saturn games
Windows games
Mobile games
Sega arcade games
Video games developed in Japan